Veronika Dostálová (born ) is a Czech volleyball player, playing as a libero. She is part of the Czech Republic women's national volleyball team.

She competed at the 2014 FIVB Volleyball World Grand Prix, 2015 Women's European Volleyball Championship, and 2019 Women's European Volleyball League, winning a gold medal.

On club level she plays for VK Dukla Liberec.

References

1992 births
Living people
Czech women's volleyball players
Place of birth missing (living people)
Liberos